Sémien is a town in western Ivory Coast. It is a sub-prefecture of Facobly Department in Guémon Region, Montagnes District.

Sémien was a commune until March 2012, when it became one of 1126 communes nationwide that were abolished.

In 2014, the population of the sub-prefecture of Sémien was 28,812.

Villages
The five villages of the sub-prefecture of Sémien and their population in 2014 are:
 Bibita (1 724)
 Kanébly (7 365)
 Sémien (10 617)
 Siambly (3 736)
 Taobly (5 370)

Notes

Sub-prefectures of Guémon
Former communes of Ivory Coast